Jeanne M. Giovannoni (1931-2009) was a University of California, Los Angeles School of Social Welfare professor, vice chancellor, and author. Her research focused on child abuse and how community members, social workers, and law enforcement response.  She retired in 1993.

Biography
Giovannoni was born in San Francisco on October 31, 1931. Her undergraduate education was at University of California, Berkeley, earning a bachelor's of social work in 1953 and her Master of Social Work at the same school in 1955. Her doctorate was in 1966 from Brandeis University. She died at UCLA Medical Center, Santa Monica on September 17, 2009, of lung cancer.

Before starting to teach at UCLA in 1969, she taught got three years at the UC Berkeley School of Social Welfare.

She died on 17 December 2009.

Publications

Books
 What she was most known for having written was the 1979 book Defining Child Abuse which she co-wrote with UCLA colleague Rosina M. Becerra.
 Children of the Storm: Black Children and American Child Welfare 1972
 Child Abuse and Neglect: An Examination from the Perspective of Child Development Knowledge 1978

Miscellaneous
 Jeanne Giovannoni, Review of for reasons of poverty, Children and Youth Services Review, Volume 13, Issue 3, 1991, Pages 223-229, ISSN 0190-7409, https://doi.org/10.1016/0190-7409(91)90007-5 (https://www.sciencedirect.com/science/article/pii/0190740991900075)

References

1931 births
UCLA Luskin School of Public Affairs faculty
University of California, Berkeley alumni
Brandeis University alumni
2009 deaths
American women academics
University of California, Berkeley School of Social Welfare faculty
American social sciences writers